Another Life, also known as Lovers, is a 2013 French romantic drama film written and directed by Emmanuel Mouret. It stars JoeyStarr, Virginie Ledoyen and Jasmine Trinca.

Cast 
 JoeyStarr as Jean 
 Virginie Ledoyen as Dolorès 
 Jasmine Trinca as Aurore 
 Stéphane Freiss as Paul 
 Ariane Ascaride as Claudine
 Clément Rousset as Thomas
 Thibault Vinçon as The young composer
 Bernard Verley as The doctor

References

External links 
 

2013 films
2013 romantic drama films
2010s French-language films
French romantic drama films
Films directed by Emmanuel Mouret
2010s French films